Lisa Bird-Wilson is a Métis and nêhiyaw writer from Saskatchewan.

Biography
A survivor of the Sixties Scoop, as a child Bird-Wilson was adopted, disconnecting her from her Cree and Métis heritage. This experience informs much of her writing.

Bird-Wilson's debut collection of short stories, Just Pretending (2013), was chosen as the Saskatchewan Library Association's 2019 One Book One Province. The book won four Saskatchewan Book Awards (including 2014 book of the year), and was a finalist for the 2014 Danuta Gleed Literary Award. Reviewing the stories for The /tƐmz/ Review, Amy Mitchell says "the stories and characters are so alive, and the writing is so beautiful in its stripped-down simplicity."

She has also published poetry and non-fiction books.

, Bird-Wilson is a director at the Gabriel Dumont Institute, the education arm of the Métis Nation-Saskatchewan. She is also a founding board member and chair of the Ânskohk Aboriginal Writers' Circle and founding president of the Saskatchewan Aboriginal Literacy Network.

Works
 An Institute of Our Own: A History of the Gabriel Dumont Institute, non-fiction (Gabriel Dumont Press, 2011)
 Just Pretending, short stories (Coteau Books, 2013)
 The Red Files, poetry (Nightwood Editions, 2016)
 Probably Ruby, novel (Doubleday Canada, 2021)

Awards
2014
 Shortlisted for the Danuta Gleed Literary Award for Just Pretending
 University of Regina Book of the Year for Just Pretending
 SaskPower Fiction Award for Just Pretending
Rasmussen, Rasmussen & Charowsky Aboriginal Peoples' Writing Award for Just Pretending
First Nations University of Canada Aboriginal Peoples' Publishing Award for Just Pretending
YWCA Women of Distinction Award for Arts, Culture or Heritage
2017
 John Hodgin's Founder Award for short story "Counselling"
2018
 Saskatchewan Arts Board, RBC Emerging Artist Award
2019
 Silver Medal, Column, National Magazine Awards for "Clowns, Cake, Canoes: This is Canada?"
2022
 Shortlisted for the Amazon.ca First Novel Award for Probably Ruby

References

Further reading

External links
 Lisa Bird-Wilson; Saskatchewan Writers' Guild
Lisa Bird-Wilson Website

Métis writers
Living people
21st-century Canadian women writers
21st-century Canadian poets
Canadian women poets
21st-century Canadian short story writers
Canadian women short story writers
Writers from Saskatchewan
Year of birth missing (living people)
21st-century Canadian novelists
Canadian women novelists